Stewart Laing is a Scottish theatre director and a  set designer.  He was born in Blair Gowrie and raised in East Kilbride.

Laing designed both the set and the costumes for the musical "Titanic". His set design for the musical was described as "technically astonishing".  Laing won a Tony Award in 1997 for his set design.

Laing`s first production design after graduating from Central School of Art and Design was In the Bar of a Tokyo Hotel by Tennessee Williams for Internationalist Theatre at London`s New End Theatre in 1983.

References

External links
 Stewart Laing Tony Awards Info

Living people
Scottish theatre directors
Set designers
Tony Award winners
Year of birth missing (living people)
British theatre directors